PTU, also known as PTU: Police Tactical Unit, is a 2003 Hong Kong crime thriller film produced and directed by Johnnie To, starring Simon Yam, Maggie Shiu, Lam Suet and Ruby Wong.

Plot
The film follows a series of encounters of a group of patrolling Police Tactical Unit troopers during one night, which starts off when the patrol-team tries to help a sergeant of the District Anti-Triad Squad of the Hong Kong Police Force, Lo Sa, to retrieve his lost service-issue revolver after he was assaulted by a group of triad members. The films portrays the police officers' use of extra-legal means to achieve the results of investigations and reveals the complex relationships between criminals and police officers, the hostility amongst criminals themselves and even the rivalry among different bureaux within the Hong Kong Police Force.

Cast
 Simon Yam as Police Tactical Unit Sergeant Mike Ho
 Maggie Shiu as Police Tactical Unit Sergeant Kat
 Lam Suet as District Anti-Triad Squad Sergeant Lo Sa
 Ruby Wong as District Crime Squad Inspector Leigh Cheng
 Raymond Wong Ho-yin as Constable Wong 
 Eddy Ko as Eye Ball 
 Loi Hoi-pang as Bald Head

Production
It was shot entirely at night.

While the final shootout sequence of the film takes place in Canton Road, To reportedly said that "if there was a single location where he would have wanted to stage a gunfight battle, it was Cameron Road, but he could not get permission from the police to do it". The sequence was actually shot in Ap Lei Chau.

Reception

Awards and nominations
Cognac Festival du Film Policier
 Special Jury Prize (Johnnie To)

Golden Bauhinia Awards
 Won: Best Actor (Simon Yam) 
 Won: Best Director (Johnnie To)
 Won: Best Picture (Johnnie To)
 Won: Best Screenplay (Yau Nai-Hoi and Au Kin-Yee)
 Won: Best Supporting Actor (Lam Suet)

Golden Horse Film Festival 
 Won: Best Screenplay (Yau Nai-Hoi and Au Kin-Yee)
 Nominated: Best Actor (Simon Yam) 
 Nominated: Best Cinematography (Cheng Siu-Keung)
 Nominated: Best Director (Johnnie To)
 Nominated: Best Editing (Law Wing-cheung)
 Nominated: Best Costume Design (Sukie Yip) 
 Nominated: Best Original Film Score (Chung Chi Wing)
 Nominated: Best Picture (Johnnie To)
 Nominated: Best Sound Effects (Martin Chappell) 
 Nominated: Best Supporting Actor (Lam Suet)
 Nominated: Best Visual Effects (Stephen Ma)

Hong Kong Film Awards
 Won: Best Director
 Nominated: Best Actor (Simon Yam)
 Nominated: Best Cinematography (Cheng Siu-Keung)
 Nominated: Best Film Editing (Law Wing-Cheong)
 Nominated: Best Original Film Score (Chung Chi Wing)
 Nominated: Best Picture (Johnnie To)
 Nominated: Best Screenplay (Yau Nai-Hoi and Au Kin-Yee)
 Nominated: Best Sound Effects (Martin Chappell)
 Nominated: Best Supporting Actress (Maggie Shiu)
 Nominated: Best Visual Effects (Stephen Ma)

Hong Kong Film Critics Society Awards
 Won: HKFSC Award (Johnnie To)
 Won: Film of Merit

Seattle International Film Festival
 Won: Asian Trade Winds Award (Johnnie To)

Sequels

Tactical Unit: The Code (2008), directed by Wing-cheong Law
Tactical Unit: No Way Out (2009), directed by Lawrence Ah Mon
Tactical Unit: Human Nature (2008), directed by Andy Ng
Tactical Unit: Partners (2009), directed by Lawrence Ah Mon
Tactical Unit: Comrades in Arms (2009) directed by Wing-cheong Law

References

Further reading

External links
 
 
 
 HK cinemagic entry
 PTU at LoveHKFilm.com

2000s Cantonese-language films
2003 films
Hong Kong neo-noir films
2003 crime thriller films
Films directed by Johnnie To
Films with screenplays by Yau Nai-hoi
Hong Kong crime thriller films
2000s Hong Kong films